Sara J. Shettleworth (born 1943) is an American-born, Canadian experimental psychologist and zoologist.  Her research focuses on animal cognition.  She is professor emerita of psychology and ecology and evolutionary biology at the University of Toronto.

She was brought up in Maine and is a graduate of Swarthmore College in Pennsylvania. She started her PhD at the University of Pennsylvania and transferred to the University of Toronto, where she finished her doctoral studies in comparative psychology. She has lived in Canada since 1967. Until his death in 2015, she was married to biologist Nicholas Mrosovsky.

Shettleworth's research focuses on adaptive specializations of learning and the evolution of cognition. She has been a Guggenheim Fellow and a visiting fellow at Magdalen College and  Oxford University.  Her research has been supported continuously since 1974 by the Natural Sciences and Engineering Research Council of Canada.

Shettleworth was honoured by the Comparative Cognition Society at their 2008 annual meeting for her contributions to the study of animal cognition.  In 2012 the Canadian Society For Brain, Behaviour and Cognitive Science honoured her with the Donald Hebb award for her distinguished contributions to psychological science.

Selected bibliography 
Books

 Shettleworth, S. J. (2012). Fundamentals of Comparative Cognition (Fundamentals in Cognition). Oxford University Press.
 Shettleworth, S. J. (2009). Cognition, Evolution, and Behavior (2nd ed). Oxford University Press.

Scientific Publications

 Shettleworth, S. J. (2012). Do Animals Have Insight, and What Is Insight Anyway? The Canadian Journal of Experimental Psychology, 66(4), 217–226. 
 Shettleworth, S. J. (2010). Clever animals and killjoy explanations in comparative psychology. Trends in Cognitive Sciences, 14(11), 477–481.
 Sutton, J. E. & Shettleworth, S. J. (2008). Memory without awareness: Pigeons do not show metamemory in delayed matching-to-sample. Journal of Experimental Psychology: Animal Behavior Processes, 34(2), 266–282.  
 
 Cheng, K., & Shettleworth, S. J., Huttenlocher, J., & Rieser, J. (2007). Bayesian integration of spatial information. Psychological Bulletin, 133(4), 625–637.

A full list of publications can be found here

References

External links
Sara Shettleworth's Website at U of T

1943 births
Animal cognition writers
Living people
Swarthmore College alumni
University of Toronto alumni
Canadian psychologists
Canadian zoologists
Women zoologists
Academic staff of the University of Toronto
Experimental psychologists
Canadian women scientists